Balūchī (also Romanized as Baluchi, Blūči and Bluchi) is a town in Orūzgān Province, Afghanistan.

See also
 Orūzgān Province

References

Populated places in Urozgan Province